Aiysha Kenya Smith (born July 18, 1980) is a former professional basketball player who spent her career for the Washington Mystics of the WNBA. She was drafted by the Mystics (seventh overall) in the 2003 WNBA Draft.

High school
Smith attended Bishop Borgess High School in Detroit, Michigan.

College
At Tyler Junior College, Smith was a member of the Kodak All-America First Team (2001) and NCJCAA All-America (2001). At LSU she was a member of the All-SEC First Team (2002) and All-SEC honorable mention (2003)

St. John's and LSU statistics
Source

WNBA
Smith played two seasons for the Mystics, playing in sixty games and starting five.

International competition
Smith was an alternate on Team USA in the 2001 World University Games.

Personal life
Smith is married to former NFL defensive end Marcus Spears.  The couple have three children: Macaria Reagan Spears (born 2007), Marcus Rayshon Spears, Jr. (born 2009), and Miko Reign Spears (born 2013).

References

External links
 

1980 births
Living people
American women's basketball players
Basketball players from Detroit
Junior college women's basketball players in the United States
LSU Lady Tigers basketball players
Bishop Borgess High School alumni
St. John's Red Storm women's basketball players
Washington Mystics players
Universiade gold medalists for the United States
Universiade medalists in basketball
Forwards (basketball)
Medalists at the 2001 Summer Universiade
21st-century American women